Cuiping is the core urban district of the city of Yibin in Sichuan Province, People's Republic of China, located at the confluence of the Jinsha and Min Rivers, which form the Yangtze here. It was formerly the county-level city of Yibin until 1997, when Yibin was upgraded to a prefecture-level city and the original urban core of Yibin was renamed Cuiping District.

External links

Counties and districts of Yibin